Chi Aquilae (χ Aql, χ Aquilae) is the Bayer designation for a binary star in the equatorial constellation of Aquila, the eagle. This system is bright enough to be seen with the naked eye at a combined visual magnitude of +5.29.

The two components of χ Aquilae can be separated in the spectrum and their relative brightness has been measured, but their other properties are uncertain. The cool component is a G2 bright giant or supergiant and is visually brighter than the hot component, so it is treated as the primary. The hot component is a late B- or A-type star, presumed to be a main-sequence star.

The observed spectrum of the primary star is G2 Ib, a yellow supergiant. It is calculated to have an absolute magnitude of −2.1. The secondary is observed to have a spectral type of B5.5 and is expected to be a main-sequence star with an absolute magnitude of −1. However, the brightness difference between a G2 supergiant and a B5.5 dwarf is expected to be larger. It is unclear whether the primary is not a supergiant or the secondary is brighter than a main-sequence star.

As of 2004, the secondary is located at an angular separation of 0.418 arcseconds along a position angle of 76.7° from the primary. The separation and position angle are both decreasing.

References

External links
 Image Chi Aquilae
 HR 7497
 CCDM 19425+1150

Aquila (constellation)
186203
Aquilae, Chi
G-type bright giants
G-type supergiants
096957
Aquilae, 47
7497
B-type main-sequence stars
Durchmusterung objects
Binary stars